Hapton is a village and former civil parish, now in the parish of Tharston and Hapton, in the South Norfolk district, in the county of Norfolk, England, located about nine miles south of Norwich. In 1931 the parish had a population of 159. On 1 April 1935 the parish was abolished and merged with Tharston.

The villages name means 'H(e)abba's farm/settlement'.

Description
The local church is dedicated to St. Margaret and was originally built in the 13th century  despite having a Victorian bell tower with a solitary bell.
Village amenities include a primary school and a piece of land next to the church which was purchased in 2004 on behalf of the village for common use and now has a picnic bench and BBQ with disabled access. The local shop and post office have closed in recent years.

Hapton Hall is located close to the village and the Norwich-London Liverpool St. mainline. Several years ago, it was bought by Redwings Horse Sanctuary which now owns much of the land surrounding it. Before that time it was a working farm.

Neighbours
Nearby villages include Tharston, Flordon, Fundenhall, Tasburgh and Tacolneston.

References

External links

 GENUKI entry for Hapton, Norfolk

Villages in Norfolk
Former civil parishes in Norfolk
South Norfolk